Izquierda Abierta (IA) is a left-wing political party that was founded in 2012. The party was formed by an internal tendency of United Left of the same name and Ezker Batua – Berdeak. XTenerife, Green Network and Convergence for Extremadura. IA is part of the United Left coalition.

References

External links
 Official website.

United Left (Spain)
Political parties established in 2012
Republican parties in Spain
Democratic socialist parties in Europe
2012 establishments in Spain